Matthew Joseph Merritt (April 2, 1895 New York City – September 29, 1946 Malba, Queens, NYC) was an American businessman, World War I veteran, and politician from New York. From 1935 to 1945, he served three terms in the U.S. House of Representatives.

Life
He attended the schools of New York City, and enlisted in the United States Army for World War I.  as a sergeant in Company C, 327th Tank Battalion, a unit of the newly organized Tank Corps of the American Expeditionary Forces.

World War I 
After the war Merritt engaged in the real estate and insurance businesses in New York City from 1926 to 1933, and served with the New York loan agency of the Reconstruction Finance Corporation in 1933 and 1934.

Political career 
In 1934, 1936, 1938, 1940 and 1942, Merritt was elected at-large as a Democrat to the 74th, 75th, 76th, 77th and 78th United States Congresses, holding office from January 3, 1935, to January 3, 1945.

Later career and death 
Afterwards he resumed his work in real estate and insurance.

He died on September 29, 1946 and was buried at the Mount St. Mary's Cemetery in Whitestone, New York.

References

1895 births
1946 deaths
Politicians from New York City
United States Army personnel of World War I
Democratic Party members of the United States House of Representatives from New York (state)
20th-century American politicians